Oshigambo is a settlement in the Oshikoto Region of northern Namibia. It is situated on the banks of Oshigambo River east of the Etosha pan.

The village features a secondary school, Oshigambo High School, as well as a primary school.

See also
Onamukulo

References

Populated places in the Oshikoto Region